Khonsa East is one of the 60 assembly constituencies of  Arunachal Pradesh a north east state of India. It is part of Arunachal East Lok Sabha constituency.

Members of Legislative Assembly

 1990: T.L. Rajkumar, Indian National Congress
 1995: T.L. Rajkumar, Indian National Congress
 1999: T.L. Rajkumar, Indian National Congress
 2004: Kamthok Lowang, Independent
 2009: Kamthok Lowang, All India Trinamool Congress
 2014: Wanglam Sawin, People's Party of Arunachal

Election results

2019

See also

 Khonsa
 Tirap district
 List of constituencies of Arunachal Pradesh Legislative Assembly

References

Assembly constituencies of Arunachal Pradesh
Tirap district